The 1959 NCAA Track and Field Championships were contested June 12−13 at the 38th annual NCAA-sanctioned track meet to determine the individual and team national champions of men's collegiate track and field events in the United States. This year's meet was hosted by the University of Nebraska at Memorial Stadium in Lincoln.

Kansas won the team national championship, the Jayhawks' first team title.

Program changes 
 The two-mile run event was discontinued after being held annually since 1921.
 The 5,000 meter run was added to the NCAA championship program, the first new event since 1948.

Team Result 
 Note: Top 10 only
 (H) = Hosts

See also 
 NCAA Men's Outdoor Track and Field Championship
 1958 NCAA Men's Cross Country Championships

References

NCAA Men's Outdoor Track and Field Championship
NCAA Track and Field Championships
NCAA
NCAA Track and Field Championships